Trichobaris bridwelli is a species of flower weevil in the beetle family Curculionidae. It is found in the US, Dominican Republic and Puerto Rico.

References

Baridinae
Articles created by Qbugbot
Beetles described in 1935